Krini is a small town of approximately 500 year-round inhabitants in Northern Greece. Krini is a community of the municipal unit Triglia, regional unit of Chalkidiki. Krini's main agricultural crops include wheat, olives, onions, grapes, and anise.

Populated places in Chalkidiki

ar:كريني، تريكالا